Kløfta is a town located in Ullensaker, Akershus, Norway. It has a population of approximately 7,170 inhabitants. Kløfta has a soccer team called Kløfta IL, and a shopping market. Kløfta has three schools – a middle school and two first through seventh grade school.

Literally translated, the name means 'the cleft' in English. It probably refers to a junction of three roads heading for Oslo, Trondheim and Kongsvinger. At Kløfta, the road RV2 towards Sweden branches off from the E6. Two railway lines to the north also split here.

Norway's main prison, Ullersmo prison, is located in Kløfta. It is also home to some of the largest farming equipment companies in Norway. Ullensaker Church, built in 1958, lies just outside Kløfta. This church is often referred to as the "Romerike cathedral".

Augustus "Gus" Halvorsen Hilton (1854-1919), the father of American hotelier Conrad Hilton and emigrant to the United States, was born at Kløfta

Kløfta was, until 1995, the location of a longwave broadcasting station, which broadcast on 216 kHz.

References

Villages in Akershus
Populated places in Akershus
Ullensaker